TCS-OX2-29 is an orexin antagonist. It was the first non-peptide antagonist developed that is selective for the orexin receptor subtype OX2, with an IC50 of 40nM and selectivity of around 250x for OX2 over OX1 receptors. Orexin antagonists are expected to be useful for the treatment of insomnia, with subtype-selective antagonists such as TCS-OX2-29 potentially offering more specificity of action compared to non-selective orexin antagonists like almorexant.

References 

Carboxamides
Orexin antagonists
Norsalsolinol ethers
4-Pyridyl compounds
Sedatives
Tert-butyl compounds